Ritwik, Ritwick, Rithvik or Ritvik may refer to 
Ritwik (given name) 
 Ritwik (theatre group), a Bengali theatre group
Kattappanayile Rithwik Roshan, a 2016 Indian Malayalam-language film
Ritvik Holdings, a Canadian children's toy company 
Kirkbi AG v Ritvik Holdings Inc, a 2005 decision of the Supreme Court of Canada